Siege of Guines may refer to:

Siege of Guines (1352), the unsuccessful siege of the town by the French during the Hundred Years' War
Siege of Guines (1436), the unsuccessful siege of the town by the French during the Hundred Years' War
Siege of Guines (1514), the unsuccessful siege of the town by the French during the War of the League of Cambrai
Siege of Guines (1558), the siege and capture of the town by the French during the conquest of the Pale of Calais